Juan Martín Cadelago (born January 22, 1989 in Castelar, Argentina) is an Argentine footballer currently playing for Independiente F.B.C. of the Primera División in Paraguay.

Teams
  San Lorenzo 2006-2010
  F.C. Südtirol 2010
  Ilvamaddalena 2010-2011
  Independiente F.B.C. 2011–2012
  Club Deportivo Morón 2012-2013
  Ilvamaddalena 2013-2014
  Club Atlético Fenix 2015-actualidad

Titles
  San Lorenzo 2007 (Torneo Clausura Argentine Championship)
Deportivo Moron 2012-2013

References
 
 

1989 births
Living people
Argentine footballers
Argentine expatriate footballers
Independiente F.B.C. footballers
San Lorenzo de Almagro footballers
Expatriate footballers in Italy
Expatriate footballers in Paraguay
Association football defenders